Kepler is the eleventh studio album by Singaporean singer Stefanie Sun, released on 27 February 2014 by Universal Music Taiwan.

Track listing

References

2014 albums
Stefanie Sun albums